David E. Vogt III (born 1984) is an American politician who served as a member of the Maryland House of Delegates for the 4th district from 2015 to 2019.

Early life and education 
Vogt was born in Tampa, Florida. He attended the University of South Florida from 2002 to 2004 and later earned a Bachelor of Arts degree in English from the University of Maryland, College Park in 2009. In 2013, he earned a Master of Arts degree in science and governance studies from American Military University.

Career 
From 2004 to 2012, Vogt served as a legal specialist in the United States Marine Corps. During his military service, he was deployed to Afghanistan. After leaving the Marines, Vogt worked as a restaurant manager. He was elected to the Maryland House of Delegates in November 2014 and assumed office in January 2015. Vogt was a candidate for Maryland's 6th congressional district in the 2016 election, placing fifth in the Republican primary.

References

Republican Party members of the Maryland House of Delegates
Living people
1984 births
People from Tampa, Florida
21st-century American politicians
Date of birth missing (living people)
University of Maryland, College Park alumni